is a Japanese video game composer and saxophonist.

Biography
Hibino was born in Osaka. He graduated from the Osaka University School of Human Sciences in 1996. After graduating from Berklee College of Music in 1997, he moved to Kansas City to start a career as a solo jazz musician. He later relocated to Japan to work for Konami, where he became known for his work on Konami's Metal Gear Solid and Zone of the Enders video game series.

After working with Konami, Hibino started his own company, GEM Impact, which is a studio consisting of composers Takahiro Izutani, Yoshitaka Suzuki, Takahide Ayuzawa, and himself. An additional part of GEM Impact is GEM Factory, an in-house record label which has put out the debut album of The Outer Rim and the Ninja Blade soundtrack. Through GEM Impact, Hibino and his team have been able to work on games, anime, websites, and other projects that require music. While their involvement with Metal Gear Solid 4: Guns of the Patriots was not publicized by Konami, Hibino divulged in an interview with Original Sound Version that GEM Impact in fact provided approximately 90 minutes of music for the game's cinematic sequences. On September 2, 2008, Hibino and GEM Impact were announced to be the composers for the action title Ninja Blade.

In 2009, GEM Impact's in-house label, GEM Factory released the two-disc Ninja Blade soundtrack, and Hibino went on to found Hibino Sound Therapy Lab, a venture that explores the therapeutic applications of music. His first project under this company was Prescription for Sleep, an iPhone and iPod touch application that attempts to lure users to sleep with 20 minutes of soothing, live-recorded music. Hibino also teamed up with a Chinese producer to create Gentle Love, a light smooth jazz arrangement album of pop hits from China, Japan, and the US. Other activities included a panel at GDC 2009 about the game music business in Japan, two performance at the 2009 GANG Awards, performances of "Snake Eater" at Video Games Live in Singapore and Brazil, and a live performance of Gentle Love. GEM Impact also contributed to the score for Bayonetta. He was also awarded the Berklee "Distinguished Alumni" award for his entrepreneurial spirit and use of music in unconventional ways to reach a new audience.

After 2009, Hibino worked on fewer game projects and focused his energies on the therapeutic applications of music being explored through Hibino Sound Therapy Lab. He began recording material under the GENTLE LOVE moniker, featuring himself on saxophone and pianist Ayaki Sato (AYAKI) on piano. Several albums were recorded, including the Hibino Sound Therapy Lab Sound Library and Prescription for Sleep Volume 2. Over the next several years, Hibino would record solo harp, chamber groups, and more GENTLE LOVE to amass a library for his new therapeutic sound system called the RINSHU, which is a hand-carved sound system crafted by woodworkers in Japan in the likeness of a yacht. The system was released in Japan in 2014 and was patented and released in the United States in 2015.

After the 2011 Tōhoku earthquake and tsunami that struck Japan, Hibino and AYAKI toured the affected areas, performing free concerts to promote healing for those in need. This resulted in the creation of the Music in Heaven spiritual care events which have taken place all throughout Japan, combining musical performances, conceptual footage displayed on a large screen above the stage, and a wellness event. Music in Heaven, which began in 2013, celebrated 50 performances in 2015, and is still being regularly scheduled throughout Japan.

Hibino continued to maintain his ties with the game industry starting in 2014 with the launch of Prescription for Sleep: Game Music Lullabies, produced and published by Scarlet Moon Records. The series features Hibino and AYAKI teaming up as GENTLE LOVE to perform popular video game music to sleep and relax to. The series expanded to include Prescription for Sleep: Game Music Lullabies Volume II in 2015, a tribute to former Nintendo president Satoru Iwata and Hibino's mentor Eiki Oshiimi titled Prescription for Peace: A Tribute to the Departed, and a third full-length album titled Prescription for Sleep: Lullabies of Mana, dedicated to Secret of Mana.  A fourth Prescription for Sleep album, announced on November 2, 2016, will feature arrangements from Undertale. In 2016, Hibino co-wrote the score for the animated short, Sinmara Saga, with composer Dale North.

Works

References

1973 births
20th-century Japanese composers
20th-century Japanese male musicians
20th-century jazz composers
20th-century saxophonists
21st-century Japanese composers
21st-century Japanese male musicians
21st-century jazz composers
21st-century saxophonists
Anime composers
Berklee College of Music alumni
Japanese jazz composers
Japanese jazz musicians
Japanese jazz saxophonists
Konami people
Living people
Male jazz composers
Musicians from Osaka
Osaka University alumni
Video game composers